Soest-Bad Sassendorf Airfield (ICAO: EDLZ), located in the Sauerland region close to Soest and the Möhnesee, between the A 44 and B 1, is now a civilian airfield.  It is rated / approved as a 'special landing site'.  These are often used by private aero clubs.  Unlike a commercial airfield, only the operators (and upon request also third parties) may take off and land.  There is no obligation to operate, and therefore published opening times are not required.

Military history
Previously been used by the Royal Canadian Army from 1953 to 1971, in the latter part of the Cold War (from 1971 until mid-1994), 3 Regiment Army Air Corps (3 AAC) of the British Army was based here.  3 AAC operated Westland Scout AH1, Westland Gazelle AH1, and Westland Lynx AH1 and AH7 helicopters.  AAC units based there included: 653, 654, 660, 662, and 663 squadrons.  Following the drawdown of British Forces Germany (BFG), 3 Regiment Army Air Corps subsequently relocated to Wattisham Airfield, Suffolk, England.

Site / services
They are both grass runways, with headings 07/25. The traffic pattern runs south, as the northerly air space is reserved for skydivers. The airfield frequency is 122.600 MHz. There is a fuel station at the airfield with Avgas, Mogas, and Jet A-1 available.

Flying operations
Two clubs are based here: the Flugsportgemeinschaft Soest e.V (Soest Flying Club) operating powered aircraft and gliders, and the Fallschirmsportclub Soest-Bad Sassendorf e.V (Soest-Bad Sassendorf Skydiving Club).  There is also a gyrocopter flying school operating here, run by the Flugdienst Sauerland.  Flying is usually on Saturdays, Sundays, and public holidays (occasionally also on normal business days), weather permitting.  The gliding season runs regularly from late March or early April to late October or early November.  Powered flight takes place year-round.

The small airfield also holds flying days where aerobatics and stunts are presented by professional pilots and aerobatic pilots.

See also
List of airfields and special landing sites in Germany (German Wikipedia page)
German-language Wikipedia article - from which this article was started.

References

External links

Flugsportgemeinschaft Soest e.V. — flying club
Segelflieger der Flugsportgemeinschaft Soest e.V. — gliding club
Fallschirmsportclub Soest-Bad Sassendorf e.V. — skydiving club
Soester Flugtagen — air days

History of the British Army
Airports in North Rhine-Westphalia
Soest (district)